Victoria and Albert was an electoral district in the South Australian House of Assembly from 1902 to 1915. The seat elected candidates of both major parties at various times. It merged the seats of Victoria and Albert, which were both recreated on its abolition.

At its creation in 1902, it included booths at Beachport, Bordertown, Conmurra, Cookes Plains, East Wellington, Frances, Furner, Glenroy, Holder, Kalangadoo, Keith, Kingston SE, Kingston On Murray, Lucindale, Lyrup, Meningie, Millicent, Mount Gambier, Murtho, Naracoorte, Nildottie, Mundalla, Paisley, Penola, Point McLeay, Port MacDonnell, Pyap, Robe, Tantanoola, Waikerie and Wolseley. It added booths at Coonalpyn, Glencoe and Wow Wow (1905), and Lameroo, Rendelsham and Tailem Bend but dropped Wow Wow (1906). Additional booths in 1910 included Geranium, Kybybolite, Loxton, Parilla, Parrakie, Peake, Pinnaroo, Sherlock, Tintinarra, and Wilkawatt, with Pyap withdrawn. The final election in 1912 saw additional booths at Chapman Bore, Clanfield, Coomandook, Eastern Well, Hampton Well, Hooper, Lochaber, Maidia, Moorlands, Poyntz Bore, Seymour and Wirrega.

The abolition of Victoria and Albert in 1915 saw the re-establishment of its two predecessor electorates in Victoria and Albert, but with different boundaries than their previous incarnations.

Members for Victoria and Albert

References

External links
The 13 electorates from 1902 to 1915: The Adelaide Chronicle

Former electoral districts of South Australia